The Australian environment ranges from virtually pristine Antarctic territory and rainforests to degraded industrial areas of major cities. Forty distinct ecoregions have been identified across the Australian mainland and islands. Central Australia has a very dry climate. The interior has a number of deserts while most of the coastal areas are populated. Northern Australia experiences tropical cyclones while much of the country is prone to periodic drought. This dry and warm environment and exposure to cyclones, makes Australia particularly vulnerable to climate change -- with some areas already experiencing increases in wildfires and fragile ecosystems.

The island ecology of Australia has led to a number of unique endemic plant and animal species, notably marsupials like the kangaroo and koala. Agriculture and mining are  predominant land uses which cause negative impacts on many different ecosystems.  The management of the impact on the environment from the mining industry, the protection of the Great Barrier Reef, forests and native animals are recurring issues of conservation. 
 

The protected areas in Australia are important sources of ecotourism, with sites like the Great Barrier Reef and World Heritage sites like Tasmanian Wilderness World Heritage Area or the Uluṟu-Kata Tjuṯa National Park draw both national and international tourism. Clean Up Australia Day was an initiative developed in 1989 to collaboratively clean up local areas and is held on the first Sunday of autumn (in March).

Protected areas

Protected areas cover 895,288 km2 of Australia's land area, or about 11.5% of the total land area. Of these, two-thirds are considered strictly protected (IUCN categories I to IV), and the rest is mostly managed resources protected area (IUCN category VI).  There are also 200 marine protected areas, which cover a further 64.8 million hectares. Indigenous Protected Area have been established since the 1990s, the largest of which covers part of the Tanami Desert in the Northern Territory.

The protected natural areas include world heritage listed properties, such as the Australian Fossil Mammal Sites (Riversleigh/Naracoorte), Central Eastern Rainforest Reserves, Fraser Island, Great Barrier Reef, Greater Blue Mountains Area, Heard and McDonald Islands, Lord Howe Island, Macquarie Island, Purnululu National Park, Shark Bay, and the Wet Tropics of Queensland.

Protected mixed World Heritage listed areas include Tasmanian Wilderness, Uluṟu-Kata Tjuṯa National Park, Willandra Lakes Region and Kakadu National Park.  Ningaloo Reef and Cape Range peninsula are submitted and on the Tentative List for World Heritage listing and are Australian National Parks.

Conservation 

Although most of Australia is semi-arid or desert, it covers a diverse range of habitats, from alpine heaths to tropical rainforests, and is recognised as a megadiverse country. Because of the great age and consequent low levels of fertility of the continent, its extremely variable weather patterns, and its long-term geographic isolation, much of Australia's biota is unique and diverse. About 85% of flowering plants, 84% of mammals, more than 45% of birds, and 89% of in-shore, temperate-zone fish are endemic. Many of Australia's ecoregions, and the species within those regions, are threatened by human activities and introduced plant and animal species. The federal Environment Protection and Biodiversity Conservation Act 1999 is a legal framework for the protection of threatened species. Numerous protected areas have been created under the national Biodiversity Action Plan to protect and preserve unique ecosystems; 65 wetlands are listed under the Ramsar Convention, and 16 World Heritage Sites have been established. Australia was ranked 13th in the world on the 2005 Environmental Sustainability Index.

Most Australian woody plant species are evergreen and many are adapted to fire and drought, including many eucalyptus and acacias. Australia has a rich variety of endemic legume species that thrive in nutrient-poor soils because of their symbiosis with Rhizobia bacteria and mycorrhizal fungi. Well-known Australian fauna include monotremes (the platypus and echidna); a host of marsupials, including the kangaroo, koala, wombat; and birds such as the emu and kookaburra. The dingo was introduced by Austronesian people who traded with Indigenous Australians around 3000 BCE. Many plant and animal species became extinct soon after first human settlement, including the Australian megafauna; others have become extinct since European settlement, among them the thylacine.

Water 
Australia is the second driest continent (after Antarctica), and frequent droughts have led to the introduction of water restrictions in all parts of Australia. This has led to concern about water security in Australia by environmentalists, irrigators and state and federal governments. Diversion and capture of natural water flows for irrigation in Australia has been responsible for dramatic changes in environmental water flows, particularly in the Murray–Darling basin. The major part of Snowy River flows was diverted by the Snowy Mountains Scheme.

Australia's urban areas use wastewater treatment plants.  Both stormwater and treated sewerage flow into rivers, estuaries, nearshore waters and beaches.

Water supply

Issues 

The environmental of Australia is in a "poor state and it is deteriorating in the face of amplifying threats". Major environmental issues in Australia include whaling, logging of old growth forest, irrigation and its impact on the Murray River, Darling River and Macquarie Marshes, acid sulfate soils, soil salinity, land clearing, soil erosion, uranium mining, nuclear waste, the creation of marine reserves, air quality in major cities and around polluting industries and infrastructure, pesticide and herbicide impacts and growing of genetically modified food.

There is also a large savana called the great Australian savana.

Increased coal mining in Australia is contentious because of the effects of global warming on Australia, emissions to air from coal burning power stations, dust, subsidence, impact on rivers like the Hunter River and other water users, failure to adequately restore mined areas, and lack of sustainability. As an example, in 1999 Australia's energy consumption of coal and coal products was 47,364 thousand metric tons oil equivalent, compared to that of the world's energy consumption of coal and coal products which totalled 2,278,524 (also measured in thousand metric tons oil equivalent).

Climate change and global warming are of particular concern because of the likely effects of global warming on agriculture, the Great Barrier Reef and tourism industry, human health through mosquito-borne crydiologicyticlogy. Sea level rise could also have a profound impact on low-levelled and poorer communities and waterfront suburbs. The range of rises forecast by the IPCC Fourth Assessment Report would be sufficient to have impacts in many areas, and if the Greenland ice cap melts faster than forecast, it could have a disastrous impact.

In urban areas, noise and odour are major sources of complaints to environmental protection authorities.

Climate change

State of the Environment reports

Commonwealth of Australia 
The State of the Environment (SoE) section has responsibility for environmental reporting and implements two key interrelated initiatives: the State of the Environment report and the Essential Environmental Measures for Australia program.

State of the Environment report

The SoE section leads the development and production of the Australia: State of the Environment. The report is a comprehensive national assessment of the state of our environment produced every five years based on the best available evidence. It is tabled in accordance with section 516B of the Environment Protection and Biodiversity Conversation Act 1999, by the Minister for the Environment and Energy. The SoE report provides a vital resource for policy makers, industry and NGOs, educational institutions, the science community and the general public.

Essential Environmental Measures for Australia

The section also leads the development of the Essential Environmental Measures (EEM) program to strengthen environmental reporting. The EEM program aims to improve our capacity to track trends in the State of Australia's environment and engages with environmental experts to:
 identify measures that are essential for tracking change in the state of the environment and
 make measure-related data Findable, Accessible, Interoperable and Reusable (FAIR).
Over time, it is anticipated that information provided through the program will become a core component of the evidence used to inform national state of the environment reporting and environmental-economic accounting.

Sydney

2003
2006
2009

Victoria

South Australia

Western Australia 
The southwest coastal area has a Mediterranean climate and was originally heavily forested, including large stands of the karri, one of the tallest trees in the world. This agricultural region of Western Australia is in the top nine terrestrial habitats for terrestrial biodiversity, with a higher proportion of endemic species than most other equivalent regions. Thanks to the offshore Leeuwin Current the area numbers in the top six regions for marine biodiversity, containing the most southerly coral reefs in the world.
Average annual rainfall varies from 300 millimetres (12 in) at the edge of the Wheatbelt region to 1,400 millimetres (55 in) in the wettest areas near Northcliffe, but in the months of November to March evaporation exceeds rainfall, and it is generally very dry. Plants must be adapted to this as well as the extreme poverty of all soils. A major reduction in winter rainfall has been observed since the mid-1970s, with a greater number of extreme rainfall events in the summer months.
The central four-fifths of the state is semiarid or desert and is lightly inhabited with the only significant activity being mining. Annual rainfall averages 200–250 millimetres (8–10 in), most of which occurs in sporadic torrential falls related to cyclone events in summer months.
An exception to this is the northern tropical regions. The Kimberley has an extremely hot monsoonal climate with average annual rainfall ranging from 500 to 1,500 millimetres (20–60 in), but there is a very long almost rainless season from April to November. Eighty-five percent of the state's runoff occurs in the Kimberley, but because it occurs in violent floods and because of the insurmountable poverty of the generally shallow soils, the only development has taken place along the Ord River.

The black swan is the state bird of Western Australia.

The red-and-green kangaroo paw is the floral emblem of Western Australia.

Occurrence of snow in the state is rare, and typically only in the Stirling Range near Albany, as it is the only mountain range far enough south and with sufficient elevation. More rarely, snow can fall on the nearby Porongurup Range. Snow outside these areas is a major event; it usually occurs in hilly areas of southwestern Australia. The most widespread low-level snow occurred on 26 June 1956 when snow was reported in the Perth Hills, as far north as Wongan Hills and as far east as Salmon Gums. However, even in the Stirling Range, snowfalls rarely exceed 5 cm (2 in) and rarely settle for more than one day.
The highest observed maximum temperature of 50.5 °C (122.9 °F) was recorded at Mardie Station on 19 February 1998. The lowest minimum temperature recorded was −7.2 °C (19.0 °F) at Eyre Bird Observatory on 17 August 2008.

Tasmania 
Mild climate

Australian Capital Territory

Northern Territory 
Low relative humidity, wind and lack of rain from hot and dry in the interior to the milder, wetter climates of the south.

Environment organizations 
Australian Conservation Foundation
Australian Network of Environmental Defenders Offices (ANEDO)
Greenpeace Australia Pacific
Sustainable Population Australia
Trees for Life (Brooklyn Park)

See also 
Climate change in Australia
List of wettest known tropical cyclones in Australia
List of Australian environmental books
Ecology of Sydney
Waste management in Australia

References

Further reading 

 Jared Diamond, Collapse: How Societies Choose to Fail or Succeed, Penguin Books, 2005 and 2011. See chapter 13 entitled « "Mining" Australia » (pp. 378–416).

 
Ecology of Australia